George William Hall (12 March 1912 – 22 May 1967) was an English footballer who played for Notts County, Tottenham Hotspur and the England national team during the 1930s.

Football career 
Hall was born  in Newark, Nottinghamshire, and played for Notts County from 1930 before joining Tottenham Hotspur for a fee of £2,600 in 1932. He was a versatile inside forward and skillful dribbler. In his later career he played at full-back.

He made his international debut against France in December 1933 and went on to appear in a total of ten international games for England. During England's match against Northern Ireland on 16 November 1938, Hall scored five goals during a 30-minute period either side of half-time. Three of these were within a four-minute spell and Hall still holds the record for the fastest hat-trick for England in an international match.

During the Second World War, Hall continue to play in friendly matches for Spurs whilst also being a member of the London Police Reserve.

Later career
Ill-health brought an end to his playing career in 1945 and he suffered the amputation of both lower legs. He continued his association with the game as a vice-president of the Spurs Supporters Club and in coaching roles at Clapton Orient and other clubs. Testimonial games were played at both Tottenham and Notts County grounds in 1946. From 1954 he became a publican. The Willie Hall Memorial Trophy is still played for each year having been inaugurated in 1967, the year he died, by the Newark Football Alliance. Hall's fame was enhanced on 16 February 1959, when he was chosen as the subject of This Is Your Life by BBC Television host Eamonn Andrews.

But, no longer a man of such stamina, Hall spent more time with his sister back in Newark, fishing, and nostalgic sharing with old friends. Here, having watched Tottenham beat Chelsea 2–1 in the FA Cup  on 20 May, Hall died of a heart attack on 22 May 1967. His thanksgiving service took place on 30 May at St Mary Magdalene Church, followed by cremation, and the ashes were later interred at Newark Cemetery. Tribute has been paid locally to a man of great bravery and talent, not just in the N.A.L.H.S. plaque, but also in the Willie Hall Cup, presented annually to the winners of the Newark Sunday Alliance.

2006 brought his installation within the Tottenham Hotspur Hall of Fame.

References

External links 
 Hall's profile on englandstats.com
 England Records - England Football Online

1912 births
1967 deaths
English footballers
England international footballers
Tottenham Hotspur F.C. players
Notts County F.C. players
Association football midfielders
Association football defenders
Sportspeople from Newark-on-Trent
English Football League players
English Football League representative players
Footballers from Nottinghamshire
Chelmsford City F.C. wartime guest players